Moses S. Gibson (1816 - December 6, 1904) was an American banker from Hudson, Wisconsin who served as a Representative in the last two sessions of the Legislative Assembly of the Wisconsin Territory, as a member of the First Wisconsin Constitutional Convention, and was elected to a term in 1859 as a member of the Wisconsin State Assembly after statehood, an election successfully contested by Marcus W. McCracken. Gibson's political party affiliation is unknown.

Biography 
Gibson was born in 1816 in Livingston County, New York. He settled in Fond Du Lac, Wisconsin, in 1844. He was elected as a member of the First Wisconsin Constitutional Convention in 1846 and elected to the Legislative Assembly of the Wisconsin Territory in 1847 and 1848. In 1849, he moved to Hudson, Wisconsin, where he was appointed receiver of public moneys. He married Carrie F. Gilman (1831-1906) in 1856. In 1859, he was elected to a term in the Wisconsin State Assembly. During the Civil War, he was appointed a paymaster and assigned to Missouri, and also became a major. In 1878, he was appointed a position in the sixth auditor's office of the treasury in the post office department. He died on December 6, 1904 in Washington, D. C., and was buried in Arlington National Cemetery.

Political office 
In the State Assembly, Gibson was to represent the district which included the sparsely-populated Ashland, Burnett, Douglas, La Pointe, Polk, and St. Croix counties to succeed Republican James B. Gray. McCracken in turn was succeeded by Asaph Whittlesey, also a Republican.

References 

American bankers
Businesspeople from Wisconsin
Members of the Wisconsin Territorial Legislature
19th-century American politicians
Members of the Wisconsin State Assembly
People from Hudson, Wisconsin
1816 births
People from Livingston County, New York
1904 deaths
19th-century American businesspeople